Riverfest may refer to:

Beloit Riverfest
Cincinnati Bell/WEBN Riverfest
Riverfest, Limerick